A near-rectilinear halo orbit (NRHO) is a halo orbit with slightly curved – or nearly straight – sides between close passes with an orbiting body. The 2022 CAPSTONE mission is the first such orbit in cislunar space, and this Moon-centric orbit will serve as a staging area for future lunar missions. The orbit could be used with other bodies in the Solar System and beyond.

A halo orbit is a periodic, three-dimensional orbit associated with one of the L1, L2 and L3 Lagrange points. Near-rectilinear means that some segments of the orbit have a greater curvature than those of an elliptical orbit of the same maximum diameter, and other segments have a curvature less than that of an elliptical orbit of the same maximum diameter (taking maximum diameter as that of the smallest circle that contains the whole of the orbit). In the extreme case all segments have zero curvature with four points with infinite curvature (i.e. a polygon). Such a non-elliptical orbit would require at least two other bodies (e.g. the Earth and Moon), and thus NRHO orbits are one theoretical solution to the classic three-body problem in gravitational mechanics. Of the three bodies, one is taken to be of negligible mass (the spacecraft). 

There are four families of NRHO orbits associated with the L1 and L2 Lagrange points, two each in the northern and southern directions. The low perilune orbits are nearly polar. They are nearly stable, minimizing the artificial thrust required for station-keeping.

Planned NRHO usage   

By 2018, NASA had begun considering use of a near-rectilinear halo orbit for a future lunar mission, 
and by 2020, an NRHO is the planned orbit for the NASA Lunar Gateway, to be orbiting Earth-Moon  in circa 2024.

By 2022, the company Advanced Space built a 12-unit cubesat to fly on a Gateway precursor mission for NASA. Named CAPSTONE (Cislunar Autonomous Positioning System Technology Operations and Navigation Experiment), the spacecraft became the first spacecraft to operate in an NRHO lunar orbit from 14 November 2022 after launch on 28 June 2022. The mission objective is to test and verify the calculated orbital stability planned later for the Lunar Gateway space station, and the spacecraft will fly the identical orbital parameters planned later for Gateway. It will also test a navigation system that will measure spacecraft position relative to NASA's Lunar Reconnaissance Orbiter (LRO), without relying on ground stations.

NASA/JPL's Lunar Flashlight, a cubesat intended to search for water near the lunar south pole, will also use a near-rectilinear halo orbit.

Notes

References

External links 
 Angelic halo orbit for Gateway (video), ESA, 17 July 2019.  The planned Lunar Gateway orbit (c. 2024) appears a bit like a halo around the Moon from the point of view of an observer on the Earth.

Three-body orbits